Gandhwani Assembly constituency is one of the 230 Vidhan Sabha (Legislative Assembly) constituencies of Madhya Pradesh state in central India.

It is part of Dhar District.

Members of Legislative Assembly

Election Results

2013 results

References

Dhar district
Assembly constituencies of Madhya Pradesh